Munsubong is a South Korean mountain that sits between the city of Taebaek, Gangwon-do and the county of Bonghwa, Gyeongsangbuk-do.

See also
 List of mountains in Korea

Notes

References
 

Mountains of South Korea
Mountains of Gangwon Province, South Korea
Mountains of North Gyeongsang Province
One-thousanders of South Korea